Daniel Davari (born 6 January 1988) is a professional footballer who plays as a goalkeeper for Rot-Weiß Oberhausen.

Born in Germany of Iranian and Polish descent, he represented the Iran national team at international level.

Club career

Eintracht Braunschweig
Davari began his career with the reserve side of 1. FSV Mainz 05, before moving to Eintracht Braunschweig in 2009. Originally the club's back-up keeper, he became a starter for Eintracht Braunschweig when Marjan Petković had an injury early during the 2011–12 season. Although Petković returned from his injury a few weeks later, Davari kept the starting spot for the rest of the season, eventually leading Braunschweig to reach promotion to the Bundesliga.

On 13 August 2013, Davari played his first Bundesliga match against Borussia Dortmund in the 2013–14 Bundesliga season and earned a 1 rating from Kicker (based on a scale of 1 to 6, with 1 being the highest). Davari was voted the best Braunschweig player at the midpoint of the Bundesliga season. He was named the man of the match against Freiburg on 12 April 2014. On 10 May, Davari provided an assist to Jan Hochscheidt against Hoffenheim.

Grasshoppers
On 29 May 2014, Davari signed a contract with Swiss Super League side Grasshopper Club Zürich, joining the club on 1 July after the 2014 FIFA World Cup. On 30 July, he made his Champions League debut against Lille.

Arminia Bielefeld
On 11 June 2015, Davari joined Arminia Bielefeld in the German 2.Bundesliga on a two-year deal. He made his debut on 8 May 2016 and kept a clean sheet in a match against Union Berlin.

Davari kept a clean sheet on 17 March 2017 in a 2–0 win against Kaiserslautern to lift Arminia out of a direct relegation spot.

MSV Duisburg
He signed for MSV Duisburg for the 2017–18 season.

Rot-Weiß Oberhausen
On 26 January 2019, he moved to Rot-Weiß Oberhausen.

International career
On 21 January 2013, it was confirmed that Daniel Davari was invited to the Iran national team by manager Carlos Queiroz. Davari, who was born in Gießen, Germany to a Polish-German mother and an Iranian father, is eligible to play for Germany, Poland and Iran. However, Davari declined Iran's invitation for the Asian Cup qualifier against Lebanon as the date coincided with a crucial club match, stating that he would accept an invitation for Iran's next match.

Davari made his debut for Team Melli against Thailand on 15 November, keeping a clean sheet in a 3–0 Asian Cup qualifier win. On 1 June 2014, Davari was called into Iran's 2014 FIFA World Cup squad by Carlos Queiroz. He was an unused substitute with Alireza Haghighi starting all three matches for Iran.

Personal life
Davari was brought up as a Catholic from an Iranian father and a Polish mother. On 28 September 2014, Davari's wife Kristina gave birth to a son named Eliah.

Career statistics

See also

German-Iranians

References

External links

1988 births
Living people
Mazandarani people
Sportspeople from Giessen
Sportspeople of Iranian descent
Footballers from Hesse
German footballers
Iranian footballers
Association football goalkeepers
Iran international footballers
German people of Iranian descent
1. FSV Mainz 05 II players
Eintracht Braunschweig players
Eintracht Braunschweig II players
Arminia Bielefeld players
Bundesliga players
2. Bundesliga players
3. Liga players
Regionalliga players
2014 FIFA World Cup players
Iranian Roman Catholics
German Roman Catholics
German people of Polish descent
Iranian people of Polish descent
Iranian people of German descent
Swiss Super League players
Grasshopper Club Zürich players
MSV Duisburg players
Rot-Weiß Oberhausen players
Iranian expatriate footballers
Iranian expatriate sportspeople in Switzerland
German expatriate sportspeople in Switzerland
Expatriate footballers in Switzerland